The following is a listing of episodes of Star King. Star King is a South Korean show which first aired on January 13, 2007 on SBS and ended on August 9, 2016.

Background
It starts on every Saturday from 6:20pm to 8:00pm. Star King is the first TV show in Korea which runs online and on TV simultaneously. In addition, people come from a variety of countries such as Brazil, Mongolia and Kenya, aging from 5 years old to 101 years old. Because of these unique people, Star King easily gained audiences. Once, Star King had the best audience ratings between Saturday TV shows. However, presently, has Star King lost a lot in audience ratings after the fabrication.

Star King is hosted by Kang Ho Dong. He temporarily left the show, leaving Boom and Super Junior's leader Leeteuk as the hosts. Leeteuk has since started his military service, leaving the show to Kang Ho Dong and Boom as the hosts.

Episode Listing

References

Lists of comedy television series episodes
Lists of South Korean television series episodes